The 2017–18 FC Rubin Kazan season was the fifteenth successive season that Rubin Kazan played in the Russian Premier League, the highest tier of association football in Russia. Rubin finished the season in tenth position, and were knocked out of the Russian Cup at  the Round of 16 stage by Krylia Sovetov.

Squad
As of 2 March 2018

Out on loan

Reserves

Transfers

Summer

In:

Out:

Winter

In:

Out:

Competitions

Russian Premier League

Results by round

Results

League table

Russian Cup

Squad statistics

Appearances and goals

|-
|colspan="14"|Players away from the club on loan:

|-
|colspan="14"|Players who left Rubin Kazan during the season:

|}

Goal scorers

Disciplinary record

References

External links

FC Rubin Kazan seasons
Rubin Kazan